BXC Solar Power Station, also Onyandze Solar Power Station, is an operational 20 megawatt solar power plant in Ghana. The solar farm was developed, financed and is owned and operated by Beijing Xiaocheng Company, a Chinese independent power producer (IPP). The power station, commercially commissioned in April 2016, was the largest grid-ready IPP solar farm in Ghana, at that time. The energy generated at this power station is evacuated via a high voltage transmission line to a substation at Winneba Roundabout, where it enters the national grid.

Location
The geographical coordinates of BXC Solar Power Station are 05°22'22.0"N, 0°41'36.0"W (Latitude: 5.372778; Longitude:-0.693333). This solar farm is in close proximity to the 20 megawatt Gomoa Onyaadze Solar Power Station.

Overview
The power station has an installed maximum generation capacity of 20 megawatts, although the owner/developers have plans of expanding generation capacity to 40 megawatts. The energy generated here is conveyed via a high voltage transmission line from the power station to a substation belonging to Power Distribution Services Ghana (PDSG), formerly Electricity Company of Ghana (ECG), where the energy enters the national grid. A long-term power purchase agreement, between PDSG and the owner/operators of the power station governs the terms of sale and purchase of the energy.

Ownership
The power station is owned by Beijing Xiaocheng Company (BXC), an electronics and technology company, based in Beijing, China. The parent company has a Ghanaian subsidiary, BXC Ghana Limited. The parent funded and constructed the solar farm. The local subsidiary operates and manages the power station.

Funding
The cost of construction is reported to be US$30 million, incurred by the developer/owners of the power plant.

See also

List of power stations in Ghana

References

External links
 Africa Battles to Get Big Solar Projects on Grid As of 4 August 2016.
 Could waves become the next big renewable energy source? As of 3 January 2017.

Central Region (Ghana)
Solar power stations in Ghana
Energy infrastructure completed in 2016
2016 establishments in Ghana